George's Cosmic Treasure Hunt is a 2009 children's book written by Stephen and Lucy Hawking. George and Annie, the middle-school cosmologists, return in this sequel to the 2007 story, George's Secret Key to the Universe.

See also 
 A Brief History of Time by Stephen Hawking
 Black Holes and Baby Universes and Other Essays by Stephen Hawking
 George's Secret Key to the Universe
 George and the Big Bang
 George and the Unbreakable Code
 George and the Blue Moon

 "George and the ship of time"

External links
 Synopsis

2009 children's books
2009 science fiction novels
British children's novels
Children's science fiction novels
British science fiction novels
Popular science books
Books by Stephen Hawking